Ismael Delgado (born 5 December 1929) is a Puerto Rican sprinter. He competed in the men's 4 × 400 metres relay at the 1956 Summer Olympics. Delgado served in the United States Army in the Korean War, where he was awarded with two Purple Heart Medals. After returning from the military he finished his B.A. degree and became a teacher in Aguada but he shortly thereafter went into sports administration and sports journalism.

References

External links
 

1929 births
Living people
United States Army personnel of the Korean War
Athletes (track and field) at the 1955 Pan American Games
Athletes (track and field) at the 1956 Summer Olympics
People from Aguada, Puerto Rico
Puerto Rican male sprinters
Olympic track and field athletes of Puerto Rico
Place of birth missing (living people)
Central American and Caribbean Games medalists in athletics
Pan American Games competitors for Puerto Rico
United States Army soldiers